Françoise Sagan (born Françoise Delphine Quoirez; 21 June 1935 – 24 September 2004) was a French playwright, novelist, and screenwriter. Sagan was known for works with strong romantic themes involving wealthy and disillusioned bourgeois characters. Her best-known novel was her first – Bonjour Tristesse (1954) – which was written when she was a teenager.

Biography

Early life and career
Sagan was born on 21 June 1935 in Cajarc, Lot, and spent her early childhood in Lot, surrounded by animals, a passion that stayed with her throughout her life. Nicknamed 'Kiki', she was the youngest child of bourgeois parents – her father a company director, and her mother the daughter of landowners.

Her family spent World War II (1939–1945) in the Dauphiné, then in the Vercors. Her paternal great-grandmother was Russian from Saint Petersburg. The family had a home in the prosperous 17th arrondissement of Paris, to which they returned after the war. Sagan was expelled from her first school, a convent, for "lack of deep spirituality". She was expelled from the Louise-de-Bettignies School because she had "hanged a bust of Molière with a piece of string". She obtained her baccalauréat on the second attempt, at the cours Hattemer, and was admitted to the Sorbonne in the fall of 1952.
She was an indifferent student, and did not graduate.

The pseudonym "Sagan" was taken from a character in Marcel Proust's À la recherche du temps perdu (In Search of Lost Time). Sagan's first novel, Bonjour Tristesse (Hello Sadness), was published in 1954, when she was 18 years old. It was an immediate international success. The novel concerns the life of a pleasure-driven 17-year-old named Cécile and her relationship with her boyfriend and her widowed playboy father.

Sagan's characters, which became something of an icon for disillusioned teenagers, are in some ways similar to those of J.D. Salinger. During a literary career lasting until 1998, Sagan produced dozens of works, many of which have been filmed. She maintained the austere style of the French psychological novel even while the nouveau roman was in vogue. The conversations between her characters are often considered to contain existential undertones. In addition to novels, plays, and an autobiography, she wrote song lyrics and screenplays.

In the 1960s, Sagan became more devoted to writing plays, which, though lauded for excellent dialogue, were only moderately successful. Afterward, she concentrated on her career as a novelist.

Personal life
Sagan was married twice. On 13 March 1958, she married her first husband, Guy Schoeller, an editor with Hachette, who was 20 years older than Sagan. The couple divorced in June, 1960. In 1962, she married Bob Westhoff, a young American playboy and would-be ceramicist. The couple divorced in 1963; their son Denis Westhoff was born in June 1962. She then had a long-term relationship with fashion stylist Peggy Roche. She also had a male lover, Bernard Frank, a married essayist obsessed with reading and eating. She added to her self-styled "family" by beginning a long-term affair with the French Playboy editor Annick Geille, after Geille approached Sagan for an article for her magazine.

Fond of traveling in the United States, she often was seen with Truman Capote and Ava Gardner. On 14 April 1957, while driving her Aston Martin sports car at speed, she was involved in an accident that left her in a coma for some time. She also loved driving her Jaguar automobile to Monte Carlo for gambling sessions.

In the 1990s, Sagan was charged with and convicted of possession of cocaine.

At various times of her life, Sagan was addicted to a number of drugs. She was a long-term user of prescription pills, amphetamines, cocaine, morphine, and alcohol. When the police came for an inspection of her house, her dog Banko showed cocaine to them, and also licked the cocaine. Sagan told the police, "Look! He likes it too."

In 2010, her son Denis established the Prix Françoise Sagan.

Death
Her health was reported to be poor in the 2000s. In 2002, she was unable to appear at a trial that convicted her of tax fraud in a case involving the former French President François Mitterrand, and she received a suspended sentence. Sagan died of a pulmonary embolism in  Honfleur, Calvados on 24 September 2004 at the age of 69. At her own request she was buried in Seuzac (Lot), close to her beloved birthplace, Cajarc.

In his memorial statement, the French President Jacques Chirac said: "With her death, France loses one of its most brilliant and sensitive writers – an eminent figure of our literary life."

She wrote her own obituary for the Dictionary of Authors compiled by Jérôme Garcin: "Appeared in 1954 with a slender novel, Bonjour tristesse, which created a scandal worldwide. Her death, after a life and a body of work that were equally pleasant and botched, was a scandal only for herself."

Film
Sagan's life was dramatized in a biographical film, Sagan, directed by Diane Kurys, released in France on 11 June 2008. The French actress Sylvie Testud played the title role.

Works

Novels
Bonjour Tristesse (1954, (Hello Sadness), translated 1955)
Un certain sourire (1955, A Certain Smile, translated 1956)
Dans un mois, dans un an (1957, Those Without Shadows, translated by Frances Frenaye, 1957)
Aimez-vous Brahms? (1959, translated 1960)
Les merveilleux nuages (1961, Wonderful Clouds, translated 1961)
La chamade (1965, translated 1966 as La Chamade; newly translated 2009 as That Mad Ache)
Le garde du cœur (1968, The Heart-Keeper, translated 1968)
Un peu de soleil dans l'eau froide (1969, Sunlight on Cold Water, translated 1971)
Des bleus à l'âme (1972, Scars on the Soul, translated 1974)
Un profil perdu (1974, Lost Profile, translated 1976)
Le lit défait (1977, The Unmade Bed, translated 1978)
Le chien couchant (1980, Salad Days, translated 1984)
La femme fardée (1981, The Painted Lady, translated 1983)
Un orage immobile (1983, The Still Storm, translated 1984)
De guerre lasse (1985, Engagements of the Heart (UK) / A Reluctant Hero (U.S.), translated 1987)
Un sang d'aquarelle (1987, Painting in Blood, translated 1991)
La laisse (1989, The Leash, translated 1991)
Les faux-fuyants (1991, Evasion, translated 1993)
Un chagrin de passage (1994, A Fleeting Sorrow, translated 1995)
Le miroir égaré (1996)
Les Quatre coins du coeur, Paris, Plon, 2019

Short story collections
Des yeux de soie (1975, Silken Eyes, translated 1977)
Musiques de scène (1981, Incidental Music, translated 1983)
La maison de Raquel Vega (1985)

Plays
Château en Suède (Château in Sweden) (1960)
Les violons parfois (1961)
La robe mauve de Valentine (1963)
Bonheur, impair et passe (1964)
L'écharde (1966)
Le cheval évanoui (1966)
Un piano dans l'herbe (1970)
Il fait beau jour et nuit (1978)
L'excès contraire (1987)

Ballet
Le Rendezvous Manqué (1958)

Autobiographical works
Toxique (1964, journal, translated 1965)
Réponses (1975, Night Bird: Conversations with Françoise Sagan, translated 1980)
Avec mon meilleur souvenir (1984, With Fondest Regards, translated 1985)
Au marbre: chroniques retrovées 1952–1962 (1988, chronicles)
Répliques (1992, interviews)
...Et toute ma sympathie (1993, a sequel to Avec mon meilleur souvenir)
Derrière l'épaule (1998, autobiography)

Published posthumously by L'Herne:
Bonjour New-York (2007)
Un certain regard (2008, compilation of material from Réponses and Répliques)
Maisons louées (2008)
Le régal des chacals (2008)
Au cinéma (2008)
De très bons livres (2008)
La petite robe noire (2008)
Lettre de Suisse (2008)

Biographical works
Brigitte Bardot (1975)
Sarah Bernhardt, ou le rire incassable (1987, Dear Sarah Bernhardt, translated 1988)

Selected filmography
Bonjour Tristesse, directed by Otto Preminger (1958, based on the novel Bonjour Tristesse)
A Certain Smile, directed by Jean Negulesco (1958, based on the novel A Certain Smile)
Love Play, directed by François Moreuil and Fabien Collin (1961, based on the short story La Récréation)
Goodbye Again, directed by Anatole Litvak (1961, based on the novel Aimez-vous Brahms?)
Nutty, Naughty Chateau, directed by Roger Vadim (1963, based on the play Château en Suède)
La Chamade, directed by Alain Cavalier (1968, based on the novel La Chamade)
Un peu de soleil dans l'eau froide, directed by Jacques Deray (1971, based on the novel Un peu de soleil dans l'eau froide)
 The Blue Ferns, directed by Françoise Sagan (1977, TV film, based on the short story Des yeux de soie)
Bonheur, impair et passe, directed by Roger Vadim (1977, TV film, based on the play Bonheur, impair et passe)
, directed by Robert Enrico (1987, based on the novel De guerre lasse)
, directed by José Pinheiro (1990, based on the novel La Femme fardée)
, directed by Josée Dayan (2008, TV film, based on the play Château en Suède)

Screenwriter
Landru, directed by Claude Chabrol (1963)
The Ball of Count Orgel, directed by Marc Allégret (1970)

References

External links

Jean-Louis de Rambures, interview with F. Sagan (in French) in: "Comment travaillent les écrivains", Paris 1978
Litweb.net

French press bids farewell; BBC article

1935 births
2004 deaths
People from Lot (department)
Deaths from pulmonary embolism
French women novelists
French women screenwriters
20th-century French screenwriters
French people of Russian descent
Bisexual screenwriters
French women dramatists and playwrights
Bisexual women
French bisexual writers
French LGBT dramatists and playwrights
French LGBT novelists
French women short story writers
French short story writers
Women biographers
Bisexual novelists
20th-century French novelists
20th-century French dramatists and playwrights
20th-century French women writers
Bisexual dramatists and playwrights
20th-century biographers
20th-century short story writers
20th-century French LGBT people
21st-century French LGBT people
Signatories of the 1971 Manifesto of the 343